Bucculatrix gossypii is a moth of the family Bucculatricidae. It is found in Queensland, Australia. The species was described in 1926 by Alfred Jefferis Turner.

The larvae are considered a minor pest, since they feed on the foliage of Gossypium hirsutum. They initially mine the leaves of their host plant. Later, they eat holes in the leaves. The larvae are white with a black head, and a pair of black dots on each thoracic segment.

External links
Australian Faunal Directory
Australian Insects

Bucculatricidae
Leaf miners
Moths of Australia
Moths described in 1926
Taxa named by Alfred Jefferis Turner